Colopea is a genus of araneomorph spiders in the Stenochilidae family, and was first described by Eugène Louis Simon in 1893.

Species
 it contains ten species, found in Asia, on Fiji, and in Papua New Guinea:
Colopea laeta (Thorell, 1895) – Myanmar, Thailand
Colopea lehtineni Zheng, Marusik & Li, 2009 – China
Colopea malayana Lehtinen, 1982 – Thailand, Malaysia, Singapore
Colopea pusilla (Simon, 1893) (type) – Philippines
Colopea romantica Lehtinen, 1982 – Bali
Colopea silvestris Lehtinen, 1982 – New Guinea
Colopea tuberculata Platnick & Shadab, 1974 – Fiji
Colopea unifoveata Lehtinen, 1982 – Borneo
Colopea virgata Lehtinen, 1982 – Thailand, Vietnam
Colopea xerophila Lehtinen, 1982 – New Guinea

See also
 List of Stenochilidae species

References

Araneomorphae genera
Spiders of Asia
Stenochilidae